"Shotgun" is a song by British singer-songwriter George Ezra. The song was written by Ezra, Fred Gibson and Joel Pott and produced by Cam Blackwood. It was released as a digital download on 18 May 2018, as the third single from Ezra's second studio album Staying at Tamara's.
The song reached number one on the UK Singles Chart, becoming Ezra's first number-one song in the United Kingdom, and was certified quintuple platinum in the country. In addition, it topped the ARIA Singles Chart in Australia, also becoming Ezra's first number-one there, as well as the Irish Singles Chart and New Zealand Singles Chart.

Composition
"Shotgun" is originally in the key of F major, with a tempo of 116 beats per minute and a chord progression of F–B–Dm–C.

In 2019 it was revealed that Irish country music singer Derek Ryan will be awarded royalties (of seven and a half per cent) for the song due to its similarity to the chorus of Ryan's song Flowers In Your Hair released in 2014.

Critical reception
In a review for NME, Rhian Daly described the song as "anthemic" with a "balmy sound".

Music video
A lyric video, which has Ezra performing the song in multiple locations, was first released on YouTube on 18 May 2018 and has over 300 million views as of March 2022. The official music video was also released on YouTube on 14 June 2018 and has over 70 million views as of March 2022.

Charts

Weekly charts

Year-end charts

Decade-end charts

Certifications

Release history

See also 
 List of best-selling singles in Australia

References

2018 singles
2018 songs
George Ezra songs
Columbia Records singles
Dutch Top 40 number-one singles
Irish Singles Chart number-one singles
Number-one singles in Australia
Number-one singles in Scotland
Songs written by George Ezra
UK Singles Chart number-one singles
Songs written by Joel Pott
Song recordings produced by Cam Blackwood